Pelagicoccus mobilis is a Gram-negative and chemoheterotrophic bacterium from the genus of Prosthecobacter which has been isolated from seawater from Japan.

References

Verrucomicrobiota
Bacteria described in 2007